Wellington Street (officially in ) is an east–west thoroughfare located in Montreal, Quebec, Canada. It starts at LaSalle Boulevard in the borough of Verdun, passes through Pointe-Saint-Charles and Griffintown in the  borough of Le Sud-Ouest, and terminates at McGill Street in Old Montreal in the borough of Ville-Marie. Wellington Street spans  in length.

De L'Église métro station is located on the street.

Wellington Street is named for Arthur Wellesley, 1st Duke of Wellington (1769–1852), a British field marshal and two-time prime minister of the United Kingdom. The Duke of Wellington is best known for having defeated Napoleon I of France in the Battle of Waterloo in June 1815.

Wellington Street serves as a shopping district for the borough of Verdun and most of the neighbourhood of Pointe Saint-Charles. It is primarily industrial between the railroad tracks in Pointe Saint-Charles and the Bonaventure Expressway. The electrical substation Poste Adélard-Godbout and the de L'Église metro station are sited on the street.

Points of interest

Marguerite Bourgeoys Park
St. Ann Park

References

Streets in Montreal
Verdun, Quebec